Gone Now is the second studio album by American indie pop act Bleachers, released on June 2, 2017. The album deals with the difficulties of growing old as well as struggling with losing people in life, told over the course of day and a lifetime. It takes inspiration from the pop sounds of the 1980s, mixed with a modern view.

Artwork

The cover features Antonoff wearing a white prince outfit with his hand placed over his heart in a Polaroid style frame. According to Antonoff, the photo of himself on the cover is a view of what he might look like if he were dead. In a series of videos breaking down the album, he stated: That's why on the cover -- everyone's like, "what are you, a dictator?" And I'm like no, man, I'm dead. I'm supposed to be dead. I thought if I was dead, what would I look like? I'd be black and white, and I'd be regal, and dressed up. That's the picture you'd have on a mantel if I wasn't here anymore.The outfit was also used on the tour for Gone Now.

Accolades

Track listing

Notes
  signifies a co-producer
  signifies an additional producer

Personnel
Musicians
 Jack Antonoff - lead vocals
 Evan Smith - background vocals (tracks 1 & 7), saxophone (tracks 1, 2, 9, 11 & 12) & horns (tracks 5, 7 & 10)
 Camilla Venturini - speaking voice (tracks 1, 5, 6 & 11)
 Nico Segal - trumpet (tracks 2, 8, 9 & 12)
 Lena Dunham - background vocals (tracks 2, 7 & 8)
 Andrew Dost - background vocals (track 2)
 Alfie Silbert - crying (track 2)
 Evan Winiker - bass (track 3)
 Sean Hutchinson - drums (tracks 3, 5 & 11)
 Lorde - background vocals (tracks 3 & 4)
 Carly Rae Jepsen - background vocals (track 3)
 Julia Michaels - background vocals (track 3)
 Sam Dew - background vocals (tracks 3, 8, 11 & 12)
 Mikey Freedom Hart - guitar (tracks 4, 7 & 11), piano (track 8)
 Greg Kurstin - keyboard (track 4), linn drum (track 4)
 Mike Riddleberger - drums (track 7)
 MØ - background vocals (track 7)
 Nicole Atkins - background vocals (track 9)
 Phillip Peterson - strings (track 10)
 Victoria Parker - strings (track 10)
 Sleepy Brown - background vocals (track 11)
Production
 Jack Antonoff - production, mixing (tracks 1, 3, 8 & 11)
 Laura Sisk - vocal production (tracks 1-3, 5-12), engineering
 Emile Haynie - co-production (track 2), additional production (track 5)
 Organized Noize - additional production (track 2 & 11)
 Tom Elmhirst - mixing (tracks 2, 5, 6, 10 & 12)
 Greg Kurstin - co-production (tracks 3 & 4), engineering (track 4), additional production (track 9)
 Vince Clarke - additional production (track 4)
 Julian Burg - additional engineering (track 4)
 Alex Pasco - additional engineering (track 4)
 Serban Ghenea - mixing (tracks 4 & 7)
 Nineteen85 - production (track 7)
 Sounwave - additional production (track 8 & 12)
 John Hill - additional production (track 8)
 Neal Avron - mixing (track 9)

Charts

Terrible Thrills, Vol. 3

Terrible Thrills, Vol. 3 is the second compilation album by American indie pop act Bleachers, released in March 2019 as a companion to Gone Now. Following Terrible Thrills, Vol. 2 (2015), it is a cover album composed of songs from Bleachers' second studio album covered by female artists, as well as rare songs and demos. It was released by RCA Records as a set of four 7-inch singles.

Track listing
Unless otherwise indicated, all tracks are performed by Bleachers.

References

 

2017 albums
Bleachers (band) albums
Albums produced by Jack Antonoff
Albums produced by Emile Haynie
Albums produced by Greg Kurstin
Albums produced by Vince Clarke
Albums produced by John Hill (record producer)
Albums produced by Nineteen85
Albums produced by Organized Noize
Albums produced by Sounwave
Electropop albums
Synth-pop albums by American artists
New wave albums by American artists
RCA Records albums